Bathe is a surname. Notable people with the surname include:

Bill Bathe (born 1960), American baseball player
Charlotte Bathe (born 1965), British equestrian
Frank Bathe (born 1954), Canadian ice hockey player
Sir Henry de Bathe, 4th Baronet (1823–1907), British Army general
James Bathe (c.1500–1570), Irish judge
John Bathe (disambiguation), multiple people
Klaus-Jürgen Bathe (born 1943), German civil engineer
Ryan Michelle Bathe (born 1976), American actress
Thomas Bathe, 1st Baron Louth (died 1478), Irish barrister and judge
Walter Bathe (1892–1959), German swimmer
William Bathe (judge) (c.1530-1597), Irish judge and landowner
William Bathe (1564–1614), Anglo-Irish Jesuit priest, musician, and writer

See also
Bath (surname)
Bather (surname)